Panagiotis Linardos (born 7 August 1991) is a Greek professional footballer who plays as a midfielder for Super League 2 club Panachaiki.

Career
Linardos started his football career in amateur football leagues of Aetoloacarnania Football Clubs Association playing for the local team of his hometown AE Mesolongi.

Move to Cyprus 
He later moved on to Cyprus to become a professional football player as he played for several teams including Apollon Limassol and Anorthosis who played both were part of the Cypriot First Division.

Panegialios 
In the summer of '15 he returned to Greece as he signed a contract with Panegialios. In Panegialios F.C., Linardos played in twenty five games and netted four times.

Veria 
His performances in Football League led Veria to sign him on 20 July 2016 on a free transfer.

AEK Kerkyra 
On 15 September 2018, he signed a one-year contract with Kerkyra on a free transfer.

Panachaiki 
Linardos made 12 appearances in all competitions, including 10 in the Super League Greece 2, in the 2019–20 Superleague Greece 2 season before terminating his contract to move to Singapore.

Geylang International 
Linardos signed for Singapore Premier League side Geylang International FC for the 2020 Singapore Premier League season. He terminated his contract with Panachaiki F.C. because he received a lucrative offer of more than €70,000 a year, from the Eagles.

Honours
Levadiakos
Super League 2: 2021–22

References

1991 births
Living people
People from Missolonghi
Greek footballers
Greek expatriate footballers
Association football midfielders
Super League Greece players
Veria F.C. players
Panegialios F.C. players
AEZ Zakakiou players
Anagennisi Deryneia FC players
Omonia Aradippou players
Cypriot Second Division players
PAS Lamia 1964 players
PAE Kerkyra players
Levadiakos F.C. players
Football League (Greece) players
Footballers from Western Greece